The Scruton number Sc is an important parameter for vortex-induced vibration (excitation) of structures, vibrations caused by rain or wind, dry inclined cable galloping, and wake galloping, the unstable airflow that forms around bridge cables and other cylindrically-structured buildings. It is named after Christopher "Kit" Scruton, a British industrial dynamics engineer.

It is defined by:

where 
{|
|-
|  || is the structural damping expressed by the logarithmic damping decrement,
|-
| || is the effective mass per unit length,
|-
| || is the density of the air, or liquid,
|-
| || is the characteristic width of the structure.
|}

References

Dimensionless numbers of fluid mechanics